Arctostaphylos edmundsii, with the common name Little Sur manzanita, is a species of manzanita. This shrub is endemic to California where it grows on the coastal bluffs of Monterey County.

Description
This is a petite, low-lying manzanita which forms mounds and patchy mats in sandy soil. The leathery leaves are small and rounded to oval, dark green and shiny when mature and red-edged when new. The inflorescences are dense with flowers, which are small, urn-shaped to rounded, and waxy white to very pale pink. The fruit is a shiny, reddish-brown drupe between one half and one centimeter wide. It is a perennial shrub.

See also
California chaparral and woodlands - (ecoregion)
California coastal sage and chaparral - (sub-ecoregion)

References

External links
Jepson Manual Treatment - Arctostaphylos edmundsii
USDA Plants Profile: Arctostaphylos edmundsii
Arctostaphylos edmundsii - Photo gallery

edmundsii
Endemic flora of California
Natural history of the California chaparral and woodlands
Natural history of Monterey County, California
Taxa named by John Thomas Howell
Garden plants of North America
Drought-tolerant plants